Gargela cuprealis is a moth in the family Crambidae. It was described by George Hampson in 1906. It is found on Borneo.

References

Crambinae
Moths described in 1906
Moths of Borneo